The Love Album is John Hartford's third LP, released in 1968. Like all of his RCA recordings, it was reissued in 2002 as part of a "twofer" CD, combined with his fourth album, Housing Project.

Reception

Music critic Richie Unterberger, writing for AllMusic, wrote "His droll delivery and toying with clichés makes it hard to tell whether he's the straight man or a joker, and it's that ambiguity that makes these oddball tunes so intriguing – such pleasant, straight country-pop on the one hand, but such deviously subtle irony on the other."

Track listing
All tracks written by John Hartford.
"Why Do You Do Me Like You Do?"
"The 6 O'Clock Train & a Girl With Green Eyes"
"Springtime All Over Again"
"Landscape Grown Cold"
"This Eve of Parting"
"I Would Not Be Here"
"Natural to Be Gone"
"Empty Afternoon of Summer Longing"
"A Simple Thing as Love"
"Windows"
"Prayer"
"Love Is Sweeter"

References

1968 albums
John Hartford albums
RCA Victor albums
Albums produced by Felton Jarvis